Thomas Derrick was an English executioner c. 1608.

In English history, executioner was not a commonly chosen career path because of the risk of friends and families of the deceased knowing who the executioner was and where to find him.  Executioners were sometimes coerced into the role.  Derrick in particular had been convicted of rape but was pardoned by the Earl of Essex (clearing him of the death penalty) on the condition that he became an executioner at Tyburn.

Derrick executed more than 3,000 people in his career, including his pardoner, the Earl of Essex, in 1601.  Derrick devised a beam with a topping lift and pulleys for his hangings, instead of the old-fashioned rope over the beam method.

The word derrick became an eponym for the frame from which the hangman's noose was supported and through that usage (by analogy) to modern day cranes.

References

English executioners
17th-century English people
16th-century English people
Year of death missing
Year of birth missing